Sir James Alexander Grant  (August 11, 1831 – February 5, 1920) was an Ontario physician and political figure. He represented Russell in the House of Commons of Canada as a Conservative Party of Canada member from 1867 to 1874; he also represented the City of Ottawa in the federal parliament from 1893 to 1896.

He was born in Inverness, Scotland, in 1829, the son of James Grant and Jane Ord, and came to Canada with his parents in 1830. He studied at the University of Queen's College and then studied medicine at McGill College, becoming an M.D. in 1854. In 1856, he married Maria, the daughter of Edward Malloch. Grant served as president of the College of Surgeons of Ontario and was also president of the Mechanics' Institute and Athenaeum of Ottawa. He published a number of articles in medical journals in England and Canada. Grant served as physician to several Governors General from 1867 to 1905. He was a Fellow of the Royal College of Physicians and a member of the Geological Society of England. He was named a KCMG in 1887. He died in Ottawa at the age of 88.

Archives 
There is a James Alexander Grant fonds at Library and Archives Canada. Archival reference number is R5173.

References

External links
 

1831 births
1920 deaths
Canadian Knights Commander of the Order of St Michael and St George
Physicians from Ontario
Conservative Party of Canada (1867–1942) MPs
Members of the House of Commons of Canada from Ontario
Politicians from Ottawa
Scottish emigrants to pre-Confederation Ontario
People from Inverness
Immigrants to Upper Canada
Fellows of the Royal Society of Canada